Édouard Wattelier (12 December 1876 – 18 September 1957) was a French racing cyclist. He finished third in the 1898 Paris–Roubaix, eighth in the 1901 Paris–Roubaix and second in the 1902 Paris–Roubaix.

References

External links
 

1876 births
1957 deaths
French male cyclists
Sportspeople from Val-d'Oise
Cyclists from Île-de-France